Barnet Woolf FRSE (24 November 1902 – 20 March 1983) was a 20th-century British scientist, whose disciplines
had a broad scope. He made lasting contributions to biochemistry, genetics, epidemiology, nutrition, public health, statistics, and computer science. His name appears in the Hanes-Woolf plot: a mathematical plotting of chemical reaction times.

Life & Politics
Born and raised in Hackney, the son of a cabinet maker, and influenced by the deprivation of the East End of London he joined the Communist Party as a founder member in 1920. In 1936 he helped to organise at Cable Street where demonstrators prevented the Mosleyites marching through the Jewish East End. He left the Party in 1939 due to the Molotov-Ribbentrop Pact but rejoined in 1941 when the USSR joined the war. He finally left in 1949 due to profound disagreement with the way Lysenko's flawed science was adopted in the Soviet Union.

Science
In 1921 Woolf gained a place at Sidney Sussex College, Cambridge,something that would have been unaffordable without a full scholarship, to read for the Natural Science Tripos, and graduated in 1924 with a double first. He remained in Cambridge, working in the Sir William Dunn Institute of Biochemistry under Sir Frederick Gowland Hopkins., on a series of schlarships. In 1930 he gained a PhD for a thesis on ‘Resting Bacteria and Enzyme Action’ and was one of the first people to do e-coli biochemistry. Colleagues at the Institute included JBS Haldane, Joseph Needham and Norman Pirie.

From 1934 to 1940 he worked at the Clinical Laboratory of the London Hospital under Professor John Marrack, where his research turned towards social medicine, and in 1940 he became Owen Research Fellow at Birmingham University under Lancelot Hogben.

Woolf's statistical research on infant mortality in the large towns of England and Wales during the decade 1928-38 demonstrated how poor social conditions caused infant deaths. Published in 1945, his paper was described by a scientific reviewer in 1996 as ‘a model study of inequalities in health.

During WW2 Woolf worked as a statistician in the Medical Research branch of the War Office, analysing issues such as the efficacy of penicillin treatment of battle wounds. Reports of this and other work were for restricted circulation.

After the war he was appointed to the staff of Edinburgh University, first in the Department of Social Medicine and then in the Department of Genetics, where he was promoted to Senior Lecturer and finally made Reader in 1969.

In 1947 he was elected a Fellow of the Royal Society of Edinburgh. His proposers were Francis Albert Eley Crew, James Gray Kyd, Lancelot Hogben and John Du Plessis Langrishe.

At Edinburgh University, he was notable for providing a statistical and computational service for research workers in the medical and other faculties.

Woolf was interested in the computing procedures required in statistical methods. His FRSE obituary notes that ‘Woolf's 1951 paper on "Computation and interpretation of multiple regression" is a model of clarity of exposition and was to become very widely used.

With his interests in methods of calculation he foresaw the importance of computers in statistics, and pushed for the development of computing the university, which was not in the forefront of computing in the early 1960s.

Writings
Woolf was a considerable wit and the lyricist of satirical songs on politics for Unity Theatre in the late 1930s and early 40s, many with melodies by the American Big Band leader Van Phillips. A number of these songs published by the Workers Music Association. The best known of these is " Pity the Downtrodden Landlord," which has been recorded by, among others, The Weavers, Alfie Bass, Stan Kelly, Oscar Brand and Fred Hellerman, and was published in America in 1948 in ‘The People’s Songbook’. The editors noted that the song 'was caught up by thousands of United States tenants threatened with eviction when Congress lifted rent controls.’

In the 1960s Woolf wrote the book and Van Phillips the score for the musical ‘Skerryvore’, based on a play by James Bridie about a fictional Scottish University, which was performed on both the amateur and professional stage in Scotland in the 1960s and 70s. Woolf also set songs on scientific life to popular tunes for his colleagues in the Genetics Department of Edinburgh University.

References

1902 births
1983 deaths
Fellows of the Royal Society of Edinburgh
People from the London Borough of Hackney
People educated at Hackney Downs School
Alumni of Sidney Sussex College, Cambridge
Academics of the University of Edinburgh
British communists
British geneticists
British statisticians